C-terminal-binding protein 1 also known as CtBP1 is a protein that in humans is encoded by the CTBP1 gene. CtBP1 is one of two CtBP proteins, the other protein being CtBP2.

Function
The CtBP1 protein was originally identified as a human protein that bound a PLDLS motif in the C-terminus of adenovirus E1A proteins. It and the related protein CTBP2 were later shown to function as transcriptional corepressors. That is, regulatory proteins that bind to sequence-specific DNA-binding proteins and help turn genes off. CtBPs do this by recruiting histone modifying enzymes that add repressive histone marks and remove activating marks. CtBP proteins can also self-associate and presumably bring together gene regulatory complexes.

CtBP1 is broadly expressed from embryo to adult, while CtBP2 has a somewhat more restricted pattern of expression. CtBPs have multiple biological roles and appear to be most important in regulating the epithelial to mesenchymal transition, as well as influencing metabolism. They do the latter by binding NADH in preference to NAD+, thereby sensing the NADH/NAD+ ratio. When bound, it undergoes a conformational change that allows it to dimerize and associate with its partner proteins and silence specific genes.

During skeletal and T cell development, CtBP1 and CtBP2 associate with the PLDLSL domain of δEF1, a cellular zinc finger-homeodomain protein, and thereby enhances δEF1-induced transcriptional silencing. CtBP also binds the Kruppel-like factors family of zinc finger proteins KLF3, KLF8 and KLF12. In addition, CtBP complexes with CtIP, a 125 kDa protein that recognizes distinctly different protein motifs from CtBP. CtIP binds to the BRCT repeats within the breast cancer gene BRCA1 and enables CtBP to influence BRCA1 activity. Both proteins can also interact with a polycomb group protein complex which participates in regulation of gene expression during development. Alternative splicing of transcripts from this gene results in multiple transcript variants.

C-terminal-binding protein interacting protein (CtIP) is a binding partner with CtBP, which contribute to transcription repression and cell cycle regulation, and which have a role in the cellular response to DNA damage.

Interactions
CTBP1 has been shown to interact with:

 ACTL6B,
 ARF,
 EVI1 
 FOXP2, 
 HDAC1,
 IKZF1,
 IKZF4,
 KLF3,
 KLF8,
 Mdm2,
 MLL,
 NRIP1,
 Pinin, 
 RBBP8, and
 TGIF1.
 GATA1.

References

Further reading

External links
 
 

Transcription coregulators